The Demorest Women's Club is a women's group founded in 1934 by 11 women. The historic building at 1035 Central Avenue in Demorest, Georgia the group uses was listed on the National Register of Historic Places in 2008.

The building was built in 1902 and served as the Demorest Methodist Episcopal Church, South from 1902 to 1939, then as the Demorest Methodist Church from 1939 to 1947.  It was majorly renovated in 1954 to serve as the Demorest Women's Club.  Its historical significance derives from 1954 on.

References

Women's club buildings in Georgia (U.S. state)
National Register of Historic Places in Habersham County, Georgia
Buildings and structures completed in 1954
History of women in Georgia (U.S. state)